One Lost Day is the 14th studio album by Indigo Girls, released on June 2, 2015, on IG Recordings/Vanguard Records. It was recorded at various studios in Nashville. The title One Lost Day comes from the lyrics of "Alberta."

Track listing
Odd-numbered tracks written by Emily Saliers; even-numbered tracks written by Amy Ray
"Elizabeth" – 3:37
"Happy in the Sorrow Key" – 2:58
"Southern California Is Your Girlfriend" – 4:20
"Texas Was Clean" – 4:11
"Alberta" – 3:05
"Olympia Inn" – 4:15
"If I Don't Leave Here Now" – 3:36
"Spread the Pain Around" – 4:07
"Learned It on Me" – 4:12
"The Rise of the Black Messiah" – 4:21
"Findlay, Ohio 1968" – 6:15
"Fishtails" – 3:31
"Come a Long Way" – 3:56

Personnel
Indigo Girls
Amy Ray – vocals (1–6, 8–13), electric guitar (1–3, 6, 9, 12), octave mando-guitar (3, 5), acoustic guitar (4, 13), mandolin (8, 10)
Emily Saliers – vocals (1–13), acoustic guitar (1–9, 11, 13), dulcimer (1), electric guitar (10), banjo (12)
Additional musicians
Brady Blade – drums (1, 4, 8, 10)
Butterfly Boucher – bass (3, 11)
Don Chaffer – cello (11)
Chris Donohue – bass (4)
Jordan Brooke Hamlin – clarinet (2, 11), French horn (2, 5), trumpet (2, 12), piano (3–5, 11, 12), electric guitar (3, 4, 9, 12, 13), octave mando-guitar (3, 6), programming (3), archtop guitar (4), organ (4, 6), dulcimer (5), percussion (5), bass (7), baritone guitar (8), banjo (8) pedal steel guitar (8, 12), drums (8, 13), noises (8, 11), synthesizer (9)
Lyris Hung – violin (2, 5, 8, 10, 11, 13)
Fred Eltringham – drums (3, 11, 13)
Carol Isaacs – piano (1, 3, 7, 10, 12, 13), organ (1, 10, 11, 13), accordion (8, 11)
Brian Joseph – drums (9)
Jaron Pearlman – drums (2–6, 8, 9, 11, 12), tambourine (2)
Lex Price – bass (1, 8, 10, 12), bouzouki (8)
Benjamin Ryan Williams (B.E.N) – bass (2, 5, 6, 9)

Additional singers
Lucy Wainwright Roche (8)
Jordan Brooke Hamlin (3)

Production
Jordan Brooke Hamlin  – Producer
Don Chaffer – Engineer

References

External links
Vanguard Records publicity

2015 albums
Indigo Girls albums
Vanguard Records albums